Jógvan Isaksen (born 25 August 1950 in Tórshavn) is a Faroese writer and literary historian. He is best known for his crime novels and for his book about Faroese literature  (1993, in Danish). He is leader of the Faroese publication house  which has its address in the Faroe Islands, though its committee is located in Copenhagen. It publishes Faroese books and is the oldest Faroese publishing house, having been founded in 1910.

Biography 

Jógvan Isaksen is the son of Magnhild Isaksen née Olsen and Reimar Isaksen, who both come from the village of Gøta. After finishing high school in 1970 he moved to Denmark in order to study Nordic Philology at Aarhus University. He finished his MA in Scandinavian Literature Science in 1982. Since 1986 he has been associate Professor in Faroese language and Faroese literature at the University of Copenhagen. Since 2000 he has been the main editor of the magazine  (Nordic Literature), put out by the Nordic Council.

Since 1978 Isaksen has also worked as a writer. His crime novels are popular in the Faroe Islands and are often best sellers just before Christmas. Some of them have been translated into other languages. Isaksen has also written some children's books and books about Faroese writers and literature. For his work about the Faroese writer Hanus Kamban (whose name at that time was Hanus Andreassen) and for his work for Faroese Literature, Isaksen received the Faroese Literature Prize in 1994. In 2006 he received one of the prizes of the Faroese Government, called Heiðursgáva landsins.

The crime novel  was Isaksen's first in that genre, and one of the first written in Faroese where the events take place in the Faroe Islands. It has been translated into Danish, Icelandic and German.

Bibliography

Crime fiction 
 1990 – 
 1991 – Danish: , 
 2011 – Danish: , 2nd edition, paperback. 
 1995 – German: , Pettersson, Münster 1995 (1994) (= Morden im Norden 1) 
2006 – German: , Grafit 
 1994 – Gráur oktober. Crime fiction novel.
 1995 – Danish: , 
 2011 – Danish: , 2nd edition, paperback. 
 2007 – German: . Grafit
 1996 – Á ólavsøku. Ein summarkrimi í 9 pørtum (A summer crime novel in 9 parts.)
 2005 – Krossmessa, krimi, 
 2009 – Danish: Korsmesse, Torgard, 
 2011 – Danish: Korsmesse, 2. udgave, paperback. 
 2016 – English: Walpurgis Tide, Norvik Press. 
 2006 – Adventus Domini
 2008 – Metusalem
 2011 – Danish: Metusalem, translated by Povl Skårup, published by Torgard, 259 pages, 
 2009 – Norðlýsi
 2010 – Norska Løva, (Crime fiction, about the detective Hannis Martinsson. Norska Løva or Norske Løve refers to a Danish ship, which sank in Lambavík in the Faroe Islands on 31 December 1707. Around 100 men survived and 14 lost their lives.)
 2011 – Deydningar dansa á Sandi, (Crime fiction, about the detective Hannis Martinsson)
 2012 – Tann fimti maðurin, (Crime fiction, about the detective William Hammer)
 2013 – . (Crime fiction, about the detective William Hammer), 
2014 – . (Crime Fiction about the detective Hannis Martinsson). . 
2015 – . Krimi (Crime Fiction about the detective William Hammer).  . 
2017 – Heljarportur. (Crime fiction about the detective William Hammer). Marselius. 
2018 – Anathema. (Crime fiction about the detective William Hammer). Marselius. 
2019 – Arktis. (Crime fiction about the detective William Hammer). Marselius. 
2020 – Paranoia. (Crime fiction about the detectives Hannis Martinsson and William Hammer). Marselius.

Children's books 
 1991 – Brennivargurin, detective novel for children
 1998 – Brandstifteren, Forlaget Vindrose, 
 1996 – Teir horvnu kirkjubøstólarnir. Children's book
 1999 – Barbara og tann horvna bamsan, children's book

Other works 
 1983 – Føroyski Mentunarpallurin. Greinir og ummæli
 1986 – Ongin rósa er rósa allan dagin. Um skaldskapin hjá Róa Paturssyni
 1988 – Ingen rose er rose hele dagen. Rói Paturssons digtning. (Translated to Danish)
 1987 – Amariel Norðoy. Tekstur (Text): Jógvan Isaksen. Yrkingar (Poems): Rói Patursson. Together with Anfinnur Johansen, Dorthe Juul Myhre, Troels Mark Pedersen and Rógvi Thomsen
 1988 – Í gráum eru allir litir. Bókmentagreinir
 1988 – At taka dagar ímillum. Um at ummæla og eitt úrval av ummælum
 1988 – Ein skúladagur í K. Føroyskar skemtisøgur. Í úrvali og við inngangi eftir Jógvan Isaksen (Faroese short stories, introduction by Jógvan Isaksen)
 1989 – Ingálvur av Reyni. Text: Gunnar Hoydal. Together with Dorthe Juul Myhre, Amariel Norðoy and Rógvi Thomsen
 Færøsk litteratur. Introduktion og punktnedslag. Det arnamagnæanske institut, 1992.
 1992 – Ingi Joensen: Reflektión. Fotobók (Photo book). Together with Dorthe Juul Myhre and Amariel Norðoy
 1993 – Í hornatøkum við Prokrustes. Hanus Andreassen's short stories
 1993 – Færøsk Litteratur. Forlaget Vindrose, . (About Faroese Literature)
 1995 – Treð dans fyri steini. Bókmentagreinir, 1995.
 1995 – Zacharias Heinesen. Tekstur: Jógvan Isaksen. Together with Amariel Norðoy, Dorthe Juul Myhre, Helga Fossádal and Jon Hestoy
 1996 – Var Kafka klaksvíkingur? 26 ummælir
 1997 – Tekstur til Amariel Norðoy. Norðurlandahúsið í Føroyum
 1997 – Omkring Barbara. Greinasavn. Together with Jørgen Fisker, Nils Malmros and John Mogensen, 1997.
 1997 – Homo Viator. Um skaldskapin hjá Gunnari Hoydal (About the literature work by Gunnar Hoydal)
 1998 – William Heinesen: Ekskursion i underverdenen. I udvalg og med efterskrift af Jógvan Isaksen
 1998 – Á verðin, verðin! Skaldsøgan "Barbara" eftir Jørgen-Frantz Jacobsen (About Jørgen-Frantz Jacobsen novel Barbara.
 1999 – Jørgen-Frantz Jacobsen: Den yderste kyst – og andre essays. I udvalg og med efterskrift af Jógvan Isaksen
 2000 – Ingálvur av Reyni. Víðkað og broytt útgáva (Udvidet udgave). Together with Amariel Norðoy, Dorthe Juul Myhre and Gunnar Hoydal
 2001 – Livets geniale relief – omkring Jørgen-Frantz Jacobsens roman Barbara, (Around Jørgen-Frantz Jacobsen's novel Barbara), 
 2002 – Deyðin er drívmegin. Bókimentagreinir (Articles about literature). Mentunargrunnur Studentafelagsins.
 2004 – Mellem middelalder og modernitet – Omkring William, Mentunargrunnur Studentafelagsins. (About the authorship of William Heinesen)
 2006 – Loystur úr fjøtrum – Um skaldskapin hjá Heðini Brú, Mentunargrunnur Studentafelagsins. (About the authorship of Heðin Brú)
 2008 – Dulsmál og loynigongir. Ummælir (Reviews). Mentunargrunnur Studentafelagsins
 2010 – Sóttrøll. Um søgur og skaldsøgur eftir Jens Paula Heinesen, Mentunargrunnur Studentafelagsins. (About short stories and novels by Jens Pauli Heinesen).
2014 – At myrða við skrivaraborðið. 141 pages. Mentunargrunnur Studentafelagsins.
2019 – Ars Moriendi – Kynstrið at doyggja. (About the poetry collection Gudahøvd by Jóanes Nielsen).

Recognition 
1994 Faroese Literature Prize (Bókmentavirðisløn M.A. Jacobsens) for non-fiction
2006 Faroese Cultural Prize (Heiðursgáva landsins, DKK 75.000).
2011 Faroese Literature Prize (Bókmentavirðisløn M.A.Jacobsens) for his work at the Faroese publication house Mentunargrunnur Studentafelagsins by publishing Faroese books.

References

External links 
Goodreads.com
Amazon.com
Ritograk.fo (a Faroese bookshop)
Forlagettorgard.dk, Jógvan Isaksen (in Danish)

1950 births
Faroese writers
Faroese children's writers
People from Tórshavn
Faroese male novelists
Faroese Literature Prize recipients
Living people